Volvo Cars has a long reputation as a maker of inline (or straight) engines. This list of Volvo engines gives an overview of available internal combustion engines.

When Volvo started in 1927, they ordered their engines from the engine manufacturer Penta in Skövde. The first engine was the inline four-cylinder side valve  Type DA. In 1931, Volvo acquired a majority of the Penta stock, and in 1935, Penta became a subsidiary of Volvo. For the engines used by Volvo Trucks, see List of Volvo Trucks engines.

Previous owner, Ford Motor Company, allowed Volvo to continue to design their own engines, with a new-generation straight-six engine introduced in 2006. More recently the VEA program has been launched. VEA engines are branded as "Drive-E" in marketing. In 2017, Volvo Cars announced they will no longer develop diesel engines.

Naming
To name their engines, Volvo has used:
1955–1985 — four or five characters
1985–1994 — five or six characters
1993–1994 — six to eight characters

Generally, the following naming scheme is used:
Either B for Bensin (petrol/gasoline engines) or D  for diesel engines
Two digits for engine displacement (moved after number of cylinders from 1993)
One for valves per cylinder (not found before 1985)
One to three characters for other engine features

In 2010 Volvo changed their engine branding nomenclature so that it is independent of engine size and number of cylinders. The letter "D" designates diesel and "T" petrol. Letters are followed by a number that dictate the level of power. The table below list the lower limit power required for each emblem in 2010.

Engines in production

Petrol

GEP3 
The Global Engine Petrol 3 is a three-cylinder engine jointly developed by Volvo and Geely based on the Volvo Engine Architecture. It is marketed under the Drive-E and G-power names.

VEP4 
The Volvo Engine Petrol 4 is a four-cylinder engine with 1.5L or 2.0L displacement. It is used by Volvo, Lynk&Co and Geely marque vehicles.

 T2  single turbo. From MY2016
 T3  single turbo. From MY2016
 T4  single turbo. From MY2016
 T5  single turbo. From MY2016
 T6  turbo and supercharger. From MY2016
 Polestar  turbo and supercharger. From MY2017
 T8  turbo, supercharger, and rear electric motor developing . From MY2016

Diesel

VED4 
The Volvo Engine Diesel 4 is a four-cylinder engine with 2.0L displacement. It is used by Volvo in certain markets and is the final family of Volvo Cars diesel engines after they announced in 2017 that they would no longer develop diesel engines. Most possible reason of that is a damaged overall reputation of diesel engines for passenger cars after 2015 Volkswagen Group emissions scandal.

 D2  single-turbo. From MY2016
 . In the following vehicles: S60/V60, XC60, S80/V70 & XC70/90. 
 . In the following vehicles: V40/V40 Cross Country.

Engines out of production

Side-valve six 

Volvo's first six-cylinder engine was introduced in 1929. It was a side-valve straight-six engine.
1929–1958 side-valve six — PV651/2, TR671/4, PV653/4, TR676/9, PV658/9, PV36, PV51/2, PV53/6, PV801/2, PV821/2, PV831/2 and PV60

B4B 

Volvo's next major advance was the B4B line of compact inline-four engines introduced in 1944.
1944–1956 B4B —  — fitted into the Volvo PV and Volvo Duett
B14A — twin-choke carburettor B4B - PV, Amazon, P1900
1957–1962 B16A and B16B —  — enlarged B14A fitted into the PV, Duett and Volvo Amazon

B18 

The B18 of 1960 was the company's next major advance, with five main bearings.
 1962–1974 B18 —  — new-design 1.8 & 2.0 litres overhead valve (OHV) 8v fitted into all Volvo models from 1961 to 1974 (except the 164) and 1975 U.S.-spec 240 models
 B18C - single carburetor version - fitted in the Volvo BM 320 tractor
 B18A - single carburetor version
 B18D - twin SU Carburettor version
 B18B - twin SU or Zenith carburetor version
 1969–1981 B20 —  — evolution of the B18

B30 

The B30 was Volvo's second line of straight-six engines, introduced in 1968.
 1968–1975 B30 —  — fitted to all 164 models, as well as the Volvo C303
 B30A - twin Zenith Stromberg carburetor version
 B30E - fuel injected version

V6 

Volvo introduced the PRV engine, its only V6 engine, in 1974. The PRV was available in 2.7 and 2.8 L configurations, with SOHC cylinder heads. The PRV was developed together with Renault and Peugeot; thus the acronym name PRV.
1975–1979 B27F —  SOHC — Volvo 260

SOHC 

1976–1984 B17 —  SOHC 8-valve
1979–1981 — B17A — 8.3:1 compression — 
1976–1984 B19 —  SOHC 8-valve Volvo 340/360, Volvo 240, Volvo 740
1974–1978 — B19A — 8.8:1 compression — 
1974–1981 — B19E — 8.8:1 compression — 
1979–1984 — B19A — 8.5:1 compression — /
1982–1984 — B19E — 9.2:1 compression — 
1982–1984 — B19ET — ??:1 compression — 
1976–1985 B21 — 2.1 litres -  SOHC 8-valve Volvo 240
1976 B21F — 8.5:1 compression —  — U.S. models
1977–1978 B21F — 8.5:1 compression —  — U.S. models
1977–1978 B21F — 8.5:1 compression —  — California
1979 B21F — 9.3:1 compression —  — North America
1979 B21F — 8.5:1 compression —  — California
1974–1980 B21E — 9.3:1 compression —  — European
1980 B21A — 9.3:1 compression —  — Canada
1980 B21F — 9.3:1 compression —  — U.S. & Canada models
1981 B21F — 9.3:1 compression —  — California
1981 B21F — 9.3:1 compression —  — U.S. models
1981 B21FT — 7.5:1 compression —  — U.S. Turbo
1981 B21A — 9.3:1 compression —  — Canada
1981 B21F — 9.3:1 compression —  — U.S. models
1982 B21F — 9.3:1 compression —  — U.S. models
1982 B21F — 9.3:1 compression —  — California
1982–1983 B21FT — 7.5:1 compression —  — U.S. models
1984 B21FT — 7.5:1 compression —  — U.S. models
1984 B21FT-IBS — 7.5:1 compression —  — U.S. models
1979–1984 B23 —  SOHC 8-valve Volvo 240, Volvo 740
1979–1980 B23E — 10.3:1 compression  — European
1981–1982 B23E — 10.0:1 compression —  — Canada
1983 B23F — 10.3:1 compression —  — U.S. models
1984 B23E — 10.3:1 compression —  — Canada
1983–1984 B23F — 9.5:1 compression —  — U.S. models
1984 B23F — 10.3:1 compression —  — U.S. models
1985–1995 B200 —  SOHC 8-valve Volvo 340/360 and 200/700/900 series for certain markets
1985–1995 B230 —  SOHC 8-valve Volvo 240/Volvo 740/Volvo 940
1985–1986 B230F — 9.8:1 compression —  — U.S. models
1985–1987 B230E — 9.8:1 compression — 
1988–1993 B230F — 9.8:1 compression —  — U.S. models
1985-1990 B230ET — 10.3:1 compression —  — European models
1985–1998 B230FT — 8.7:1 compression —  — U.S./European models
1993-1995 B230FB — 9.8:1 compression —  — European models
1994–1998 B230FK — 8.7:1 compression —  — European models

DOHC 

The line of multi-valve DOHC engines began with the B234 for the 1989 model year.
1989–199x B204 —  DOHC 16-valve — Volvo 740/780/940/960
1989–1992 B234 —  DOHC 16-valve — Volvo 740, Volvo 940
Volkswagen Group diesels

Volvo licensed diesel engines from Volkswagen Group for decades.
1979–1986 D20 —  inline five-cylinder SOHC,  — Volvo 240 (for Finland and possibly other export markets)
1979–1994 D24 —  inline six-cylinder SOHC,  — Volvo 240, Volvo 260, Volvo 740
1982–1996 D24T —  inline six-cylinder SOHC,  — Volvo 740, Volvo 760, Volvo 780, Volvo 940, Volvo 960
1990s–2000 D5252T —  Audi Turbocharged Direct Injection (TDI) inline five-cylinder SOHC,  — Volvo 850, Volvo S70/Volvo V70, early Volvo S80s

Volvo V8 
Volvo B36, used in trucks

Modular 

Volvo began a line of modular engines in 1990, with straight-four, straight-five, and straight-six variants. In 2016 the last Volvo Modular engine was produced.
1993–2002 B52xx —  / /  /  DOHC
1993–2002 B5202 —  — Volvo 850,
1993-1997 B5252 —  — Volvo 850,
1993–2002 B5204 —  — Volvo 850,
1993–2002 B5234 —  — Volvo 850, Volvo S60, Volvo S70, Volvo V70, Volvo C70
1998–2009 B5244 — 
1993– B5254 — 
2000–2002 B41 —  DOHC — Volvo S40/V40
B42xx —  — Volvo S40/V40
B62xx — 
1995–1998 B6254 —  DOHC 24v — Volvo 960 Europe
1991–2001 B63xx —  DOHC 24v — ????
1991–1999 B6304F —  DOHC 24v — Volvo 960, Volvo S80, Volvo S90, Volvo V90
1995-1998 B6254, B6304, B6304S, B6244
2000–2001 B6304 —  DOHC 24v — Volvo S80

SI6, Short Inline 6 

This engine was designed by Volvo in Sweden but is built in Wales, at Ford's Bridgend Engine Plant
Volvo B6324S Short I6 — 
Volvo B6304T2 Short I6 —  Turbo

VED5, Volvo Engine Diesel 5 

In the following vehicles: AWD V60/XC60.
In the following vehicle: AWD XC60.

Volvo-Yamaha V8 
This V8 engine is designed by Volvo Cars and Yamaha Motor of Japan. The engine is built by Yamaha in Japan, and other parts of the engine are added at Volvo Cars engine unit in Skövde, Sweden.
Volvo B8444S Volvo/Yamaha V8

References

Volvo Cars
Volvo